The Larkin Covered Bridge is a historic covered bridge, carrying Larkin Road across the First Branch White River in northern Tunbridge, Vermont.  Built in 1902, it is one of the last documented covered bridges to be built in Vermont during the historic period of bridge construction, and is one of five covered bridges in the town.  It was listed on the National Register of Historic Places in 1974.

Description and history
The Larkin Covered Bridge stands a short way north of the village center of North Tunbridge, on Larkin Road a short way east of its junction with Vermont Route 110. It rests on abutments of stone and concrete, and is covered by a metal roof. Its side walls are made of vertical board siding and have no openings. The portal ends and the interiors of the portals are also finished in vertical board siding. Although the trusses are set to form a rectangle, the portals are slightly skewed, giving the bridge a parallelogram shape on the outside.

The bridge was built in 1902, and is one of only two documented early 20th-century bridges in the state; the other is the Kingsbury Covered Bridge in nearby Randolph, built in 1904.  The bridge is one of five in Tunbridge, which, when combined with one in Chelsea, form a remarkably dense concentration of covered bridges across a single waterway in the state.

See also
National Register of Historic Places listings in Orange County, Vermont
List of Vermont covered bridges
List of bridges on the National Register of Historic Places in Vermont

References

Covered bridges on the National Register of Historic Places in Vermont
National Register of Historic Places in Orange County, Vermont
Bridges completed in 1902
Covered bridges in Orange County, Vermont
Buildings and structures in Tunbridge, Vermont
Road bridges on the National Register of Historic Places in Vermont
Wooden bridges in Vermont
King post truss bridges in the United States
1902 establishments in Vermont